Sidney Allen Bruce Perou (born 1937) is a British cinematographer and film director notable for his work in caves.
He has been called "renowned throughout the caving and broadcasting world," "possibly the greatest cave film maker of all time," and "the man who brought caving to the masses."
His work has received international acclaim.

Early life
Perou was born as Sidney Allen Bruce Perou in April 1937 to his father, Sid, and his mother, Harriet (who went by "Kit").
He was a serviceman in the Royal Air Force.

Career
In the mid 1960s, Perou worked as a sound recorder at Ealing Studios when it was owned by the BBC.
Because of his recreational caving experience, he was assigned to work on the documentary Sunday at Sunset Pot in 1967.
The documentary detailed the attempted rescue of caver Eric Luckhurst from Sunset Hole.
Perou was initially assigned to work on the documentary as an assistant sound recorder.
However, due to the physical and technical limitations of the initial camera operator and Perou's cave experience, he was asked to take over filming operations.
This was Perou's first experience filming underground.
After Sunday at Sunset Pot, he left his job at the BBC to move to Yorkshire, as he had decided that he wanted to be a filmmaker.
In Yorkshire, his first commission was for The World About Us to film The Lost River of Gaping Gill in 1970.

As a cinematographer and director, Perou was involved in the creation of over a dozen cave documentaries, and over 50 films in total.
He was considered especially talented at lighting the caves so that it appeared as though the only sources of illumination were the cavers' headlamps.

In 2010, Perou retired from filmmaking and emigrated from the United Kingdom.

Awards and honors
Together with Lionel Friedberg, Perou won an Emmy in 1993 for Outstanding Individual Achievement in Informational Programming for his work in Lechuguilla Cave which appeared as part of a 1992 National Geographic special, Mysteries Underground.
While Mysteries Underground won the most prestigious award of any of Perou's projects, several other documentaries won regional awards or prizes at cave-related film festivals.
The documentary The Lost River of Gaping Gill won Best TV Reportage prize at the 7th Festival International du Film de Spéléologie in 1984, Silver Gentian Prize at the 1985 International Film Festival in Trento, the Pye Colour Television Award for Best Regional Production in 1985, and shared "best story or adventure film" with Hollow Mountains of Mulu at the International Festival Internacional de Cinema Espeleològic in 1984.
The series Beneath the Pennines won the Grand Prix at the International Caving Film Festival in 1978, as well as the Royal Television Society's  Regional Programme of the Year Award.

In 1999, Perou won the Giles Barker award.

Life in media
Perou authored a book on his experiences titled 30 Years as an Adventure Cameraman.
In 2010, Martin Baines released a documentary on Perou's life titled The Sid Perou Story.

Personal life
Perou's first marriage was to Alison Wellock, a woman whom he met during the planning of the filming of The Lost River of Gaping Gill. They married on 27 March 1971 and had two children: Martin and Tom. Alison died in 1996 at age 47 after an illness.

Filmography
Perou worked on many films related to outdoor activities such as caving, rock climbing, hot air ballooning, and hang gliding.

Sunday at Sunset Pot (1967)
The Lost River of Gaping Gill (1970)
What a Way to Spend a Sunday (1972)
The Deepest Hole in the World (1973)
Castleguard - Challenge Under the Glacier (1974)
Beneath the Pennines—series (1977)
Beneath the Pennines - Alum Pot
Beneath the Pennines - Dow Cave
Beneath the Pennines - White Scar Cave
Beneath the Pennines - Lancaster Hole
Beneath the Pennines - Pippikin Pot
Speleogenesis (1978)
Rock Athlete—series (1980)
Rock Athlete - In Search of New Summits
Rock Athlete - New Extremes
Rock Athlete - First Ascent
Troll Wall (1981)
Man Bilong Hole Bilong Stone (1981)
Raging River of Annapurna (1981)
Pennine Challenge—series (1984)
Pennine Challenge - If You Can Make it to Malham
Pennine Challenge - Harmony in the Limestone Dales
Pennine Challenge - Ups and Downs to Alston
Pennine Challenge - Bad Jokes in Border Country
The Lost River of Gaping Gill - Breakthrough (1984)
Balloon Over Yorkshire—series (1984)
Balloon Over Yorkshire - Mansion to Moorland
Balloon Over Yorkshire - Search for the Summit Wind
Realm of Darkness—series
Realm of Darkness - The Elusive Depths of Mexico (1984)
Realm of Darkness - Hollow Mountain of Mulu (1984)
Realm of Darkness - Otter Hole (1984)
Realm of Darkness - Hidden Secrets of Cigalère (1985)
Realm of Darkness - Caves of Glass (1986)
Realm of Darkness - Drowned River of Dracos (1986)
The Fingertip Phenomenon (1984)
Rally in the Sky—series (1987)
Rally in the Sky - Stage 1
Rally in the Sky - Stage 2
Search Dogs of the Summit (1987)
Exploring the Great Indoors (1988)
Adventure: The Climbers (1989)
The Price of Success (1989)
Cave Diving Story—series (1989)
Cave Diving Story: The Darkness Beckons
Cave Diving Story: The Devil is a Gentleman
Cave Diving Story: Too High a Price
Cave Diving Story: Where Angels Fear
K2 Triumph and Tragedy (1990)
Deep into the Labyrinth (1992)
Hard Decisions at Sleets Gill (1992)
Mysteries Underground (1992)
Flight for Life (1994)
Flight of the Dacron Eagles (1994)
Gaping Gill - 100 Years of Exploration (1995)
John Dunne - Big Issue (1998)
Remembering Pete Livesey—series (1998)
Remembering Pete Livesey - Part 1
Remembering Pete Livesey - Part 2
Remembering Pete Livesey - Part 3
The Mysterious Life of Caves (2002)
Jerry (2004)
You Bet it's a Daft Idea (2005)
A Tribute to Mike Wooding (2006)
Off White and the Seven Dwarfs (2007)
Stump Cross Caverns (2010)
Limestone the Living Rock—series (2011)
Limestone the Living Rock: Limestone Landscapes
Limestone the Living Rock: Our Limestone Caves
Limestone the Living Rock: Limestone in our Lives
Limestone the Living Rock: Lead in our Veins
Limestone the Living Rock: A Scar on the Landscape
Limestone the Living Rock: The Coldstones Cut
Eli Simpson and the BSA (2012)
Eli Simpson - The Birth of a Yorkshire River (2012)
The Longest Dive (2014)
In Memory of Mike Boon (2015)

References

External links 

 Sid Perou - YouTube page, featuring many of his films

English cinematographers
1937 births
Living people